The Hungary Men's Under-19 National Floorball Team is the men's under-19 national floorball team of Hungary, and a member of the International Floorball Federation. The team is composed of the best Hungarian floorball players under the age of 19. The Hungarian under-19 men's team is currently ranked 18th in the world at floorball.

Roster 
As of August 3, 2021

Team Staff 
Head Coach - Tamás Csordás 

Coach - Gergely Kádár 

Manager - Attila Fodor 

Manager - Janos David Feke 

Equipment Manager - Gyula Eros

Records

All-Time World Championship Records

Head-to-Head International Records

References 

Hungarian floorball teams
Men's national floorball teams